Hendurabi or Hendorabi is an Iranian island in the Persian Gulf. Its name is derived from the Persian word  Andar-abi meaning "Inside the waters". It is located in Hormozgan Province, to the west of Kish Island and due south of Bastak. Administratively, the island is in Kish Rural District, Kish District, Bandar Lengeh County, Hormozgan Province, Iran.

See also

List of lighthouses in Iran
Bandar Lengeh
Hormozgān

References

Islands of Iran
Bandar Lengeh County
Islands of the Persian Gulf
Landforms of Hormozgan Province
Lighthouses in Iran